The 2017–18 Vanderbilt Commodores women's basketball team represents Vanderbilt University in the 2017–18 NCAA Division I women's basketball season. The Commodores, led by second year head coach Stephanie White, play their home games at Memorial Gymnasium and were members of the Southeastern Conference. They finished the season 7–24, 3–13 in SEC play to finish in a 3 way tie for eleventh place. They lost in the first round of the SEC women's tournament to Arkansas.

Previous season
They finished the season 14–16, 4–12 in SEC play to finish in thirteenth place. They lost in the first round of the SEC women's tournament to Alabama.

Roster

Schedule

|-
!colspan=12 style=| Exhibition

|-
!colspan=12 style=| Non-conference regular season

|-
!colspan=12 style=| SEC regular season

|-
!colspan=12 style=| SEC Women's Tournament

See also
 2017–18 Vanderbilt Commodores men's basketball team

References

Vanderbilt
Vanderbilt Commodores women's basketball seasons